Papyrodiscus is a genus of fungi in the family Corticiaceae. The genus is monotypic, containing the single species Papyrodiscus ferrugineus, found in Papua New Guinea.

References

External links
 

Corticiales
Monotypic Basidiomycota genera